The sixth season of the Russian reality talent show The Voice Kids premiered on February 15, 2019 on Channel One. Dmitry Nagiev returned as the show's presenter. Pelageya and Valery Meladze returned as coach, Svetlana Loboda (LOBODA) replaced Basta as a new coach for the show.

The end result of the final on April 26 was so decisive, that fans started questioning the results. Channel One TV tasked the cyber-security firm Group-IB to look for manipulations in the votes. A preliminary result confirmed vote manipulation. Channel One TV annulled the results of the final on May 16 and announced a new final show for May 24.

Coaches and presenters

There are one change to the coaching panel from season five. Coaches Pelageya and Valery Meladze are joined by LOBODA, who replaced Basta, thus making it the first season to have two female coaches.

Also there are a change to the presenters panel from season five. Dmitry Nagiev is joined by Aglaya Shilovskaya, who replaced Agata Muceniece.

Teams
Colour key

Blind auditions
A new feature this season is The Best coach of the season (also in each episode).
Colour key

The coaches performed "Venus" at the start of the show.

The Battles
The Battles start on March 29, 2019. Contestants who win their battle will advance to the Sing-off rounds.
Colour key

The Sing-offs
The Sing-offs start on March 29. Contestants who was saved by their coaches will advance to the Final.
Colour key

Live shows
Colour key

Week 1: Live Playoffs (April 19)
Playoff results were voted on in real time. Nine artists sang live and six of them were eliminated by the end of the night.
Three saved artists advanced to the Final.

Week 2: Final (April 26)

Second Final Round results were voted on in real time. Top 3 artists sang live and Mikella Abramova won the competition. However, the results have been cancelled due to external manipulation of votes. There was no winner to this season because of the manipulation. BBC reports: "Clearly this is just a TV show. But to some it reflects a wider, unpleasant reality: using money and status to sway a vote. People have shrugged that off for years in politics. But the idea that dirty practices tainted a children's talent contest has angered them.”

While many fans stated that Mikella was a decent performer, the scale of her victory was distinctly fishy, especially with some believing her vocals to be shaky. Notably, her pop-star mum, Alsou, had called openly for support: she has more than two million Instagram followers. Additionally, reports of factory workers being paid to vote added to the sense of scandal.

Week 3: (re-)Final (May 24)
While the show was shown live, the coaches were not present. Each had recorded a greeting to their team. Artists performed the following songs, however there was no voting.

After the performances The CEO of Channel One Russia, Konstantin Ernst came on stage and declared all final participants as winner. Each participant including Mikella Abramova was handed a trophy and will receive the winning prize of ₱1 mln.

Best Coach
Colour key

Reception

Rating

Notes

References

6
2019 Russian television seasons